XHZAM-FM is a noncommercial radio station on 99.1 FM in Mazamitla, Jalisco, known as Origen Radio.

History
XHZAM signed on March 1, 2011, after receiving its permit. It was originally known as Total FM and then La Número Uno. Grupo Radio Monte is owned by Héctor Álvarez Contreras, a one-time deputy to the Jalisco state legislature. In 2018, the IFT authorized the station to relocate its transmitter and upgrade from a class A to B1 station.

In 2019, the station began broadcasting Origen Radio full-time as a rimshot into Guadalajara. Origen had briefly broadcast on 1510 XEPBGR-AM prior to moving to 99.1.

References

Radio stations in Jalisco